This is a listing of the history of the World Record in the swimming event: 100 Individual Medley. The event consists of one 25-meter lap of each stroke (butterfly, backstroke, breaststroke, and freestyle), and as such is only recognized in short course (25m) pools.

Short course (25m)

Men

Women

All-time top 25

Men
Correct as of December 2022

Notes
Below is a list of other times equal or superior to 51.49:
Caeleb Dressel also swam 49.88 (2020), 50.48 (2020), 50.68 (2021), 50.74 (2021), 51.01 (2021), 51.11 (2020), 51.27 (2020), 51.36 (2020).
Vladimir Morozov also swam  50.30 (2016), 50.31 (2018), 50.32 (2018), 50.33 (2016), 50.36 (2017), 50.49 (2017), 50.55 (2016), 50.60 (2016), 50.70 (2016), 50.81 (2014), 50.84 (2018), 50.97 (2013), 51.03 (2016), 51.04 (2017), 51.05 (2016), 51.06 (2016), 51.13 (2013), 51.20 (2013), 51.36 (2013), 51.38 (2017), 51.46 (2020), 51.49 (2013).
Ryan Lochte also swam 50.81 (2010), 50.86 (2010), 51.15 (2008), 51.21 (2012), 51.24 (2014), 51.25 (2008), 51.41 (2014).
Sergei Fesikov also swam 50.96 (2009), 51.22 (2017), 51.29 (2009), 51.30 (2019), 51.35 (2009, 2014), 51.40 (2009), 51.42 (2017), 51.43 (2019), 51.45 (2009, 2017).
Marco Orsi also swam 51.03 (2018), 51.42 (2018).
Shaine Casas also swam 51.04 (2022), 51.36 (2022), 51.42 (2022).
Kliment Kolesnikov also swam 51.09 (2021), 51.15 (2019), 51.31 (2021), 51.33 (2021), 51.35 (2018), 51.46 (2019).
Marcin Cieślak also swam 51.17 (2020), 51.36 (2020).
George Bovell also swam 51.20 (2012).
Kenneth To also swam 51.21 (2013), 51.31 (2013), 51.38 (2012), 51.43 (2012), 51.47 (2012).
Michael Andrew also swam 51.22 (2022), 51.40 (2022), 51.44 (2018), 51.47 (2022).
Javier Acevedo also swam 51.38 (2022), 51.46 (2022).
Tomoe Hvas also swam 51.39 (2021).
Daiya Seto also swam 51.40 (2018), 51.46 (2021).
Thomas Ceccon also swam 51.40 (2022).
Markus Deibler also swam 51.46 (2014).
Florent Manaudou also swam 51.49 (2013).

Women
Correct as of December 2022

Notes
Below is a list of other times equal or superior to 58.21:
Katinka Hosszú also swam 56.67 (2015), 56.70 (2014), 56.75 (2017), 56.86 (2014), 56.97 (2017), 56.99 (2014, 2017), 57.02 (2017), 57.05 (2018), 57.06 (2018), 57.09 (2017), 57.12 (2016), 57.18 (2018), 57.24 (2016), 57.25 (2014, 2018), 58.26 (2017, 2018), 57.34 (2014), 57.36 (2017, 2019), 57.38 (2020), 57.44 (2018), 57.45 (2013), 57.47 (2016), 57.49 (2015), 57.50 (2013, 2017), 57.52 (2015), 57.53 (2013, 2016), 57.56 (2018) and 57.73 (2013).
Sarah Sjöström also swam 57.28 (2018), 57.30 (2017), 57.46 (2021), 57.49 (2018), 57.60 (2017), 57.92 (2021), 58.05 (2021).
Béryl Gastaldello also swam 57.43 (2020), 57.63 (2022), 57.82 (2022), 57.96 (2021).
Beata Nelson also swam 57.81 (2022), 57.90 (2021), 58.03 (2020).
Maria Kameneva also swam 57.83 (2021), 58.15 (2021).
Anastasia Gorbenko also swam 57.90 (2020, 2021), 57.91 (2020), 57.97 (2021).
Louise Hansson also swam 57.98 (2022), 58.12 (2022).
Alia Atkinson also swam 58.04 (2016).
Marrit Steenbergen also swam 58.15 (2020, 2021).

References
 Zwemkroniek
 Agenda Diana

Individual medley 100 metres
World record progression 100 metres individual medley